Peanut (Arachis hypogaea) Allergen Powder, sold under the brand name Palforzia, is an oral medication for the treatment of allergic reactions, including anaphylaxis, in children typically aged between four and 17 years of age who have confirmed cases of peanut allergy. It is taken by mouth.

Peanut allergen powder is a powder that is manufactured from peanuts and packaged in pull-apart color-coded capsules for dose escalation and up-dosing, and in a sachet for maintenance treatment. The powder is emptied from the capsules or sachet and mixed with a small amount of semisolid food, such as applesauce, yogurt, or pudding for consumption.

The most common side effects of peanut allergen powder are abdominal pain, vomiting, nausea, tingling in the mouth, itching (including in the mouth and ears), cough, runny nose, throat irritation and tightness, hives, wheezing and shortness of breath and anaphylaxis. Peanut allergen powder should not be administered to those with uncontrolled asthma.

To mitigate the risk of anaphylaxis associated with peanut allergen powder, the U.S. Food and Drug Administration (FDA) requires a Risk Evaluation and Mitigation Strategy (REMS). Peanut allergen powder is only available through specially certified healthcare providers, health care settings, and pharmacies to those who are enrolled in the REMS program. The FDA is requiring that healthcare providers who prescribe peanut allergen powder - and healthcare settings that dispense and administer peanut allergen powder - are educated on the risk of anaphylaxis associated with its use. In addition, the Initial Dose Escalation phase and first dose of each Up-Dosing level must only be administered to patients in a certified healthcare setting equipped to monitor patients and to identify and manage anaphylaxis. Patients or their parents or caregivers must also be counseled on the need for the patients to have injectable epinephrine available for immediate use at all times, the need for continued dietary peanut avoidance, and how to recognize the signs and symptoms of anaphylaxis.

In January 2020, the FDA approved the drug to Aimmune Therapeutics for mitigating "allergic reactions, including anaphylaxis, that may occur with accidental exposure to peanuts." It is the first drug approved for peanut allergies. It will not make allergic people to be able to eat normal amounts of peanuts, but will prevent allergies due to accidental eating.

History 
The effectiveness of peanut allergen powder is supported by a randomized, double-blind, placebo-controlled study conducted in the U.S., Canada and Europe in approximately 500 peanut-allergic individuals. Effectiveness was assessed by evaluating the percentage of study participants tolerating an oral challenge with a single 600 mg dose of peanut protein (twice the daily maintenance dose of peanut allergen powder) with no more than mild allergic symptoms after six months of maintenance treatment. The results showed that 67.2% of peanut allergen powder recipients tolerated a 600 mg dose of peanut protein in the challenge, compared to 4.0% of placebo recipients.

The safety of peanut allergen powder was assessed in two double-blind, placebo-controlled studies in approximately 700 peanut-allergic individuals.

On 21 December 2018, Aimmune Therapeutics applied Biologics License Application for Peanut Allergen Powder-dnfp to the U.S. Food and Drug Administration. On 13 September 2019, the FDA Allergenic Products Advisory Committee decided seven to two in favour of the approval. The final approval was issued on 31 January 2020.

On 15 October 2020, the Committee for Medicinal Products for Human Use (CHMP) of the European Medicines Agency (EMA) adopted a positive opinion, recommending the granting of a marketing authorization for the medicinal product Palforzia, intended for desensitizing children and adolescents to peanut allergy. It was approved for medical use in the European Union in December 2020.

Controversy 
Although the FDA had decided the approval of Palforzia in 2019,  the Institute for Clinical and Economic Review (ICER) reported that the clinical evidence is still insufficient. A 2019 systematic review and meta-analysis of 12 clinical trials consisting of 1041 cases questioned the safety of oral peanut allergen treatment. The study concluded that the treatments "increase allergic and anaphylactic reactions over avoidance or placebo, despite effectively inducing desensitisation."

References

Further reading

External links 
 

Allergy, peanuts
Food allergies
Immunotherapy
Powders